"Hate You" is a single by Daredevils, the side project of Bad Religion guitarist Brett Gurewitz that followed after his exit from Bad Religion in 1994.

The band has only released one single with two songs on it, "Hate You" and "Rules, Hearts".  "Hate You" was allegedly about the Bad Religion bassist Jay Bentley, who said that Brett left Bad Religion for money.

Freese, who drummed on this album was jokingly/incorrectly credited as Josh Freeze.

Track listing

"Hate You"
"Rules, Hearts"

References

1996 songs
Bad Religion songs
Epitaph Records singles
Songs written by Brett Gurewitz